Ruben Anton Zadkovich (born 23 May 1986) is an Australian former professional soccer player, and manager of Perth Glory. He played for six clubs in a career that spanned between England and Australia, notably becoming a crowd favourite at Newcastle Jets FC in the A-League. Zadkovich was also capped for Australia, representing the Socceroos on three occasions.

Club career
Born in Fairfield, Sydney, New South Wales, Zadkovich had previously played for English Football League club Notts County, scoring on his debut against Chester City, as well as Queens Park Rangers and Australian side Wollongong Wolves. He has also made several appearances for the Young Socceroos, most notably at the FIFA World Youth Championship.

Sydney FC
Following his time in England, Zadkovich returned to Australia in late 2005 and trialled for Sydney FC. He travelled with the squad to the FIFA Club World Championship and despite not making an appearance he impressed coach Littbarski, being called in as a short-term replacement for injured Ufuk Talay late in the season. After a 12-minute debut off the bench against Queensland Roar, Zadkovich impressed with his first start against Perth Glory (which included a goal), playing one game in Sydney's run to the inaugural A-League championship, earning him a two-year full-time contract. He was allowed to leave the club in March 2008.

Derby County
On 17 April 2008, it was revealed Zadkovich had signed a two-year deal with English club Derby County, although his registration was unable to be completed before 1 July. Zadkovich made his Derby debut as a second-half substitute against Norwich City at Pride Park in October 2008, in a match which Derby won 3–1. He struggled with injuries during his time at Derby and, after only 7 appearances for the club, cancelled his contract by mutual consent on 23 January 2010.

Newcastle Jets
On 6 April 2010, Zadkovich confirmed that he had penned a three-year contract with the Newcastle Jets that would see him return to play his football in Australia. Zadkovich played 97 games over four seasons with the Jets. He was appointed captain in his third season and led the team until he was recruited by Perth Glory in 2014.

Perth Glory
On 29 May 2014, Zadkovich received an early release from Newcastle Jets and signed with Perth Glory.
On 15 November 2014, Zadkovich made his debut for Perth Glory coming on as a substitute against the Western Sydney Wanderers. Glory went on to win the game 2–1. On 22 November 2014, Zadkovich came on as a substitute against Wellington Phoenix in the 61st minute but was sent off after just 17 seconds with a two-footed tackle.
On 8 May 2016, after not playing a single match in the season due to injury, Zadkovich retired from playing football.

International career
Zadkovich made his debut at right-back in the last home game of 1st round 2010 World Cup Qualifications, against China, at ANZ Stadium on 22 June 2008. Australia lost this match 1–0.

Zadkovich took part in the 2008 Olympics as part of Australia's national team (Olyroos). He scored from close range in a 1–1 draw with Serbia, Australia's only goal in an unsuccessful campaign. He also played against Argentina in what was Australia's best performance of the tournament.

Managerial career

Broadmeadow Magic
Zadkovich's first foray as a club manager arose when he was announced as the manager for Football Northern New South Wales club Broadmeadow Magic.

Hills United
Zadkovich was appointed manager of Hills United in September 2020, leaving the role only one month later.

Perth Glory
Zadkovich was appointed assistant manager of Perth Glory in October 2020. In March 2022, Zadkovich was named interim head coach of the Glory following the departure of Richard Garcia. The 2021–22 season ended with Glory finishing bottom of the league for the first time in their history. Zadkovich was appointed as permanent Head Coach in May 2022, despite only recording one win in his interim tenure.

During the 2022-23 A-league Men season, the team's run of poor performances continued with Perth Glory bottom of the table until the A-League Men season re-commences after the 2022 World Cup in Qatar. Form and results have subsequently improved in the New Year, with the team going on a 6 game unbeaten run, improving to mid table and within touch of finals football.

Career statistics

Managerial statistics

Honours

Player
Sydney FC
A-League Championship: 2005–06

Australia U20
OFC U-20 Championship: 2005

Manager
Broadmeadow Magic
National Premier Leagues Northern NSW Championship: 2018

References

External links
 Newcastle Jets
 OzFootball profile
 
 FFA – Olyroo profile

1986 births
Living people
Soccer players from Sydney
Australian soccer players
Australian expatriate soccer players
Australia international soccer players
Olympic soccer players of Australia
Footballers at the 2008 Summer Olympics
Association football midfielders
Queens Park Rangers F.C. players
Notts County F.C. players
Sydney FC players
Derby County F.C. players
Newcastle Jets FC players
English Football League players
A-League Men players
Australian people of Croatian descent
National Premier Leagues managers
Australian soccer coaches
Sportsmen from New South Wales
Australian expatriate sportspeople in England